Gordian Knot was an American rock band directed by bass guitarist Sean Malone. At times its shifting lineup included Steve Hackett of Genesis, Bill Bruford of King Crimson and Yes, Ron Jarzombek from Watchtower and Spastic Ink, as well as Jim Matheos of Fates Warning, several of Malone's former bandmates from Cynic, and John Myung from Dream Theater. Sean Malone died on December 7, 2020.

Musical style
The music of Gordian Knot is a stylistic mixture of progressive rock and metal, instrumental music reminiscent of Robert Fripp's Guitar Craft and his solo work (e.g. compare Gordian Knot's song "Grace" with Robert Fripp's "Evening Star"). Notable is their use of counterpoint, often presenting several complex intertwining layers of melodic, harmonic, and rhythmic structures. The music of Gordian Knot also relies heavily on diatonic guitar melodies although sometimes encompassing later resolved dissonances to add a jazz fusion-like flavor. The interaction between the various instruments, all played by accomplished instrumentalists, allows for communication of various melodic lines, harmonies and rhythms among guitar(s), bass, and (concerning rhythms) even drums.

Also, Gordian Knot cannot be categorized without disregarding certain aspects of their music. For example, the piece "Komm, süsser Tod, komm sel'ge" is a transcription of a piece of the same name by Johann Sebastian Bach, while some of their other pieces, most notably "Grace", have a distinct classical, even baroque Bach-like flavor, being constructed in an almost counterpoint-like fashion by interweaving several independent diatonic melodic lines from the Chapman Stick.

Other songs, such as "Muttersprache" (German for "mother tongue") or "Code/Anticode" work with on-beat/off-beat, interplay between two guitars and/or the rhythm and melody section, incorporating jazz chords and dissonant intervals to create tension and form the basis for a mixture of jazz fusion and progressive rock/metal.

Band members
Malone recruited a different line-up each time when he was recording and playing live with Gordian Knot.

Past members
 Sean Malone - bass, fretless bass, sticks, guitars, keyboards, e-bow, echoplex, loops, occasional vocals

Studio members
Sonia Lynn - vocals
Paul Masvidal - guitar
Bob Brunin - guitars
Jason Göbel - guitars
Glenn Snelwar - guitars, mandolins
Ron Jarzombek - guitars
Steve Hackett - guitars
Adam Levy - guitars
Jim Matheos - acoustic guitars
Trey Gunn - warr guitar
John Myung - chapman stick
Bill Bruford - drums
Sean Reinert - drums

Discography
Gordian Knot (1999)
Emergent (2003)

References
https://www.loudersound.com/news/cynic-bass-player-sean-malone-dead-at-50

External links
 Interview with Bill Bruford

1998 establishments in the United States
2020 disestablishments in the United States
American progressive metal musical groups
American progressive rock groups
Musical groups established in 1998
Musical groups disestablished in 2020